Craig Spence is an historian and archaeologist. He is senior lecturer at Bishop Grosseteste University in Lincoln, Lincolnshire.

Spence was employed as an archaeologist with The Museum of London. He continues with practical archaeology every summer, directing an excavation of a Roman Villa site just outside the old Lindum Colonia as part of the Lincoln Archaeological Field School.

Publications
Spence, C. (1990) The Museum of London Archaeological site manual, 2nd edition. Museum of London Archaeology Service. 
 Spence, C. (2000) London in the 1690s: a social atlas. London: CMH, Institute of Historical Research. 
Spence, C. (2012/2014). Lincoln: a history and celebration. Salisbury: Frith Book Company.
 Spence, C. (2016). Accidents and violent death in early modern London 1650–1750. Woodbridge: Boydell & Brewer.

References

Living people
People associated with Bishop Grosseteste University
Year of birth missing (living people)